Lectio brevior potior (Latin for "the shorter reading is stronger") is one of the key principles in textual criticism, especially biblical textual criticism. The principle is based on the widely accepted view that scribes showed more tendency to embellish and harmonise by additions and inclusions than by deletions. Hence, when comparing two or more manuscripts of the same text, the shorter readings are considered more likely to be closer to the original.

See also 

 Lectio difficilior potior

Bibliography 

 Epp, Eldon J., Gordon D. Fee. Studies in the Theory and Method of New Testament Textual Criticism. William B. Eerdmans Publishing Company, 1993. 

Biblical criticism
Latin literary phrases
Textual criticism
Textual scholarship